The Río Lajas Limestone is a geologic formation in Mexico. It preserves fossils dating back to the Neogene period.

See also 

 List of fossiliferous stratigraphic units in Mexico

External links 
 

Limestone formations
Neogene Mexico
Geologic formations of Mexico